Marios Themistokleous (born April 1, 1975 in Cyprus) is a retired Cypriot football midfielder. He mostly played for Olympiakos Nicosia and was the team captain. He has also played for the Cypriot National Team. He started his youth career at Chalkanoras Idaliou his local team and ended his career there in 2011.

External links
 

1977 births
Living people
Cypriot footballers
Cyprus international footballers
Sportspeople from Nicosia
Apollon Limassol FC players
AC Omonia players
Olympiakos Nicosia players
Digenis Akritas Morphou FC players
Chalkanoras Idaliou players
Cypriot First Division players
Cypriot football managers

Association football midfielders